The name Sanba has been used for two tropical cyclones in the Western Pacific Ocean. The name, submitted by Macau, means Ruins of Saint Paul's.

 Typhoon Sanba (2012) (T1216, 17W, Karen) – Category 5 super typhoon, passed south and west of Japan and made landfall in South Korea
 Tropical Storm Sanba (2018) (T1802, 02W, Basyang) – caused heavy rains, floods, and landslides across the southern and central Philippines

Pacific typhoon set index articles